Several types of connectors for car audio systems are used.

Splicing wires
Splicing wires used in car audio are mainly for power, ground, amplifier and antenna, speakers, phone and others.

Power and ground
 ACC (red),  supplies +12V power to car audio and other accessories, only when the car's ignition is switched on.
 Constant (yellow), also called BAT or Battery, provides permanent +12V power from battery. This allows the radio to retain settings (for example, stored radio stations) when the ignition is switched off.
 Illumination (orange with white stripe) or dimmer, when it is night and cars lights are turned on, head unit screen illumination is dimmed.
 Ground, abbrev. as GND (black), 0V, usually connected to the vehicle's metal chassis and body.

Speakers
Wires with black stripes are for negative power:
 Right front speaker: gray.
 Left front speaker: white.
 Right rear: purple.
 Left rear: green.

Amplifier and Antenna
They have low electric current, which is activated when the radio is turned on.
 Antenna: blue.
 Amplifier remote turn on: blue with white stripe.

Phone And Others
 Phone: the cable to mute when receiving a call is brown.
 Back view, orange with white strip, works when reverse gear light is on, and it is used to turn on the back camera screen (i.e. when parking).
 Steering Wheel Controls, SWC or Key, brown with black stripe,  usually employs CAN bus.

ISO 10487 Harness Adapter

ISO 10487 was created in 1995 and defines a standard for connectors for the head unit to the car's electrical system, consisting of a system of four different connectors typically used in head units for car audio.

Parts
Part 1 of the standard is dedicated to "Dimensions and general requirements" and Part 2 to "Performance requirements".

Power (A)
The first connector A is always present, is usually black in colour, and contains pins for power supply, off/on (typically controlled by the ignition key), optional control for a motorised antenna and so on.
 On some cars the +12V Ignition and Battery positions are reversed, such as later Volkswagen Group cars, Peugeot 106, Vauxhall Astra, Citroën C3 and some JCB tractors.
 Pin 1 is optional; used for speed-dependent volume control and possibly navigation.
 Pin 2 is optional; used for phone mute
 Pin 3 is optional; used for reversing lamp signal on Becker radios with navigation.
 Pin 6 is optional; used for vehicle instrument illumination

Loudspeaker (B)

The second connector B is for connecting four loudspeakers, front, rear, left and right, and is usually brown in colour.

Miscellaneous (C)
Connector C is optional. Sometimes it appears as one 20-pin connector, often red in colour, or it may be divided into three separate connectors which may be hooked together, in which case C1 is usually yellow, C2 is typically green and C3 is generally blue in colour. The contact spacing is narrower than the other connectors, so the C connector is sometimes referred to as mini-ISO.

Note: ISO 10487 only defines the physical attributes of the connectors, not the pin/signal designations, which are manufacturer-defined.
The example above is oriented towards VW vehicles only.

Navigation (D)
The connector D is for satellite navigation systems. It has ten pins.

Quadlock 
From 2000 and onwards, manufacturers, such as BMW, Citroën, Ford, Mercedes Benz, Peugeot, Volkswagen, Rover, Audi, SEAT, Opel or Škoda have sometimes started using a 40-pin connector instead, called the Quadlock.

Unfortunately, Quadlock may not be the description used by manufacturers of the connector components. Therefore, searching for Quadlock components may be unsuccessful; for example, Molex refers to a typical component of the connector as MOST Frame Receptacle Housing (part number 986811001).

The Quadlock connector consists of a block of 16 flat pins analogous to the two main ISO 10487 connectors. While the physical contact pins are the same, the pin allocation is not entirely the same, and the connector housing is not compatible. In addition to the 16 pins, like ISO 10487, there are minor connectors for optional equipment. They fit within the frame of the main connector, and have coding so that they cannot be interchanged. Minor connector B has 12 pins for audio output signals. Minor connector C has 12 pins for various audio sources such as CD-changers, MP3 players.

See also 
 CAN bus
 Car antenna jack
 Car radio
 Dashboard
 Dashcam
 Fuse (automotive)
 ISO 7736, standard for car radio enclosures
 Car
 Universal steering wheel control interface

References

External links
 Car Audio ISO connector pinout.
 ISO 10487 Passenger car radio connections
 Part 1: Dimensions and general requirements
 Part 2: Performance requirements
 Molex part information for MOST Frame Receptacle Housing with Lever and Cable Cover A.K.A Quadlock

Consumer electronics
In-car entertainment